Sebastian Gebhard Messmer (August 29, 1847 – August 4, 1930) was a Swiss-born prelate of the Roman Catholic Church. He served as bishop of the Diocese of Green Bay (1892–1903) and Archbishop of the Archdiocese of Milwaukee (1903–1930).

Biography

Early life and education
Sebastian Messmer was born in Goldach, Switzerland, the eldest of five children of Sebastian and Rosa (née Baumgartner) Messmer. His father, a farmer and innkeeper, also served in the Federal Assembly of Switzerland. His mother died when he was 10 years old. Messmer received his early education in Goldach, then attended the realschule in Rorschach for three years. From 1861 to 1866, he studied at the College of St. George, the diocesan preparatory seminary, in St. Gallen, Switzerland. He then studied philosophy and theology at the University of Innsbruck in Austria-Hungary.

Priesthood and ministry
Messmer was ordained to the priesthood by Bishop Atanasio Zuber on July 23, 1871. A week later, he offered his first Mass in Goldach. He accepted an invitation from Bishop James Bayley, who had visited Innsbruck to recruit missionaries for the United States, to join the Diocese of Newark in New Jersey. 

After arriving in New Jersey in September 1871, Messmer was appointed professor of theology at Seton Hall College in South Orange, remaining there until 1889. In addition to his academic duties, he served as one of the secretaries of the Third Plenary Council of Baltimore (1884) and as pastor of St. Peter's Parish in Newark (1885–86). Messmer received a Doctor of Canon Law degree from the Apollinare University in Rome in 1890, and served as a professor of canon law at the Catholic University of America in Washington, D.C., from 1890 to 1892.

Bishop of Green Bay
On December 14, 1891, Messmer was appointed the fourth bishop of the Diocese of Green Bay by Pope Leo XIII. He received his episcopal consecration on March 27, 1892, from Bishop Otto Zardetti (his former schoolmate in Rorschach), with Bishops Winand Wigger and John Keane serving as co-consecrators, at St. Peter's Church in Newark.

During his 11-year tenure, Messmer encouraged the growth of parochial schools and other religious institutions. He also invited  Abbot Bernard Pennings to establish the Norbertine Order in the United States, which led to the founding of St. Norbert College in De Pere.

Archbishop of Milwaukee
On November 28, 1903, Messmer was appointed the fourth archbishop of the Archdiocese of Milwaukee by Pope Pius X. He was installed on December 10, 1903. He succeeded Archbishop Frederick Katzer.

An opponent of Prohibition in the United States, Messmer issued a pastoral letter in 1918, declaring, "[People] fail to see the absolutely false principle underlying the movement and the sinister work of the enemies of the Catholic Church trying to profit by this opportunity of attacking her in the most sacred mystery entrusted to her." In 1921, he prohibited Catholic children in Milwaukee from participating in a Fourth of July Pilgrim pageant, which he described as "exclusively a glorification of the Protestant Pilgrims," but later withdrew his objections. Messmer was also opposed to women's suffrage. He denounced the labor movement as being tinged with socialism, and drew criticism from Polish Catholics after condemning the Kuryer Polski newspaper.

During his 26-year tenure, Messmer oversaw the establishment of Mount Mary College in Milwaukee and the elevation of Marquette College to Marquette University. He actively supported the American Federation of Catholic Societies as well as ministries for African American and Hispanic Catholics. Nearly 30 religious orders were founded and charitable institutions were doubled during his administration; what became Catholic Charities of the Archdiocese of Milwaukee, a nonprofit that still exists today, was founded in 1920.</ref><ref> He founded the Catholic Herald, the official newspaper of the Archdiocese of Milwaukee, in 1922.

Messmer died on March 4, 1930, while vacationing in his Goldach, at age 82. At the time of his death, he was the oldest Catholic bishop in the United States. He is buried in Goldach.  Messmer High School in Milwaukee, was renamed in his honor in 1928.

See also

 Catholic Church hierarchy
 Catholic Church in the United States
 Historical list of the Catholic bishops of the United States
 List of Catholic bishops of the United States
 Lists of patriarchs, archbishops, and bishops

References

External links
Archbishop Messmer at Archdiocese of Milwaukee

1847 births
1930 deaths
20th-century Roman Catholic archbishops in the United States
Roman Catholic archbishops of Milwaukee
Roman Catholic bishops of Green Bay
Seton Hall University faculty
Swiss emigrants to the United States
19th-century Swiss Roman Catholic priests
Catholic University of America faculty
University of Innsbruck alumni
19th-century American Roman Catholic priests